Mount Wyatt is a mountain and rural locality in the Whitsunday Region, Queensland, Australia. In the  Mount Wyatt had a population of 51 people.

Geography 
Mount Wyatt is a largely undeveloped and sparsely populated area. There are large areas of mining exploration permits in the southern part of the locality. The Burdekin Dam is on the western boundary of the locality. The Suttor River which flows into the Burdekin Dam forms the south-western boundary of the locality; the Sellheim River flows through the south-western part of the locality into the Suttor River. The Burdekin River (upstream from the dam) forms the north-western boundary; the Bowen River flows through the northern part of the locality into the Burdekin River.

History
In the  Mount Wyatt had a population of 51 people.

Heritage listings 
Mount Wyatt has a number of heritage-listed sites, including:
 Strathbowen-Leichhardt Range Road: Bowen River Hotel

References

Whitsunday Region
Localities in Queensland